Peters and Lee were a successful British folk and pop duo of the 1970s and 1980s, comprising Lennie Peters (22 November 1931 – 10 October 1992, Enfield, Middlesex) and Dianne Lee (born February 1949).

Background
Lennie Peters (AKA Gary Hall; born Leonard George Sargent, 22 November 1931, Islington, North London), an uncle of Rolling Stones drummer Charlie Watts, was blinded in one eye during a car accident when he was five years old. A thrown brick blinded his other eye when he was sixteen. Before Peters and Lee, he was a pianist playing the London pub scene. He recorded two singles on the Oriole label, "Let the Tears Begin" and "And My Heart Cried" in 1963 and 1964 respectively. In 1966 he recorded "Stranger in Paradise" for Pye Records and then "Here We Go Again" on the Gemini label in 1970. The latter he would revisit as Peters and Lee in 1976. He teamed up with actress and dancer Dianne Lee (born Dianne Littlehales, February 1949, Sheffield, West Riding of Yorkshire, England) in 1970. Lee would provide backing vocals for Peters' solo act. She was also at the time part of a dance act with her cousin Liz.

Their original act was called Lennie Peters and Melody until their management International Artists suggested the name Peters and Lee. Their first performance was with Rolf Harris on 30 April 1970 at a concert in Bournemouth.

Early success
The duo entered the TV talent show Opportunity Knocks, which they won for a then-record seven times, with such songs as "All Change Places", "I'm Confessin'", "Let It Be Me" and "All I Ever Need is You". Following their TV success, a record contract was soon signed with Philips Records. They were produced by Philips' A&R man Johnny Franz, and their management company was International Artists, run by showbiz professionals Phyllis Rounce and Laurie Mansfield. Franz found the song that suited them well, and their recording quickly led to a number one hit; "Welcome Home" sold over 800,000 copies in Britain. A successful first album, We Can Make It, followed, which also reached the number one position, selling over 250,000 copies. Further single hits followed with "Don't Stay Away Too Long", which reached #3, and "Hey Mr Music Man".

TV appearances
The duo was top of the bill at the Royal Variety Performance in 1973. They were also resident guest stars on The Des O'Connor Show, had slots on The Golden Shot, Mike and Bernie Winters' Show, Presenting Nana Mouskouri, Seaside Special and David Nixon's show.

Peters and Lee had a popular (now lost) TV series of their own Meet Peters & Lee, including several Christmas specials made by ATV. "The Peters and Lee Story" was one Christmas special made for 27 December 1975 which starred Mike and Bernie Winters, Cleo Laine and Aiden J Harvey, who won New Faces in 1974.  Their success made them household names and frequent appearances on Top of the Pops also kept their record sales steady.

Their last TV appearance before their split was London Night Out in November 1980 in which they performed four songs from their farewell album.

Solo and reunion
Lee went on to perform mainly in theatre and acting roles, whilst Peters recorded his only solo album Unforgettable in 1981 and released three singles, "Record of My Love" in 1981, "Why Me" for Christmas 1982 and "Key Largo" in 1985. Peters also appeared on a few small TV slots and appeared briefly as a crime boss in the 1984 film The Hit, but without a huge success. Despite their fame, neither Peters nor Lee could repeat the success they enjoyed whilst together.

The pair reunited in 1986 with a new single, "Familiar Feelings", to perform on the nostalgia circuit. They also made some TV appearances, performing their new single. The duo went on to record two new albums, one in 1989 and the last in 1992 for their 21st anniversary, before Peters' death from bone cancer in 1992, aged 60. Their final TV appearance was Pebble Mill in February 1992 with a short interview and a performance of the hit "Hey Mister Music Man". Sporting a broken arm, Peters' illness was apparent. Lee went on to marry Rick Price of Wizzard and recorded a solo album Chemistry in 1994. She continued to tour with Price as a duo, performing hits and new material, until his death in May 2022.

Personal lives
In August 2005, Peters' daughter, Lisa Sullivan, was strangled to death, at age 40, by her partner, Terry Game. The murder took place at the Martello Caravan Park in Walton-on-the-Naze, Essex, where her body was later found. In March 2006, Game was sentenced to life in prison for the murder. The Judge Philip Clegg, in the sentence said, Sullivan had been "the victim of domestic violence".

Discography

We Can Make It (1973)
By Your Side (1973)
Rainbow (1974)
Favourites (1975)
Serenade (1976)
Invitation (1976)
Smile (1977)
Love and Affection (1979)
The Farewell Album (1980)
Peters & Lee (1989)
Through All the Years (1992)

References

External links
 Mark Wirtz (producer) discography

English folk musical groups
Musical groups established in 1970
Living people
English musical duos
Date of birth missing (living people)
Year of birth missing (living people)
Folk music duos